Inland may refer to:

Places

Sweden
 Inland Fräkne Hundred, a hundred of Bohuslän in Sweden
 Inland Northern Hundred, a hundred of Bohuslän in Sweden
 Inland Southern Hundred, a hundred of Bohuslän in Sweden
 Inland Torpe Hundred, a hundred of Bohuslän in Sweden

United States
 Inland Northwest (United States), also known as the Inland Empire, a region in the U.S. Pacific Northwest
 Inland Township, Cedar County, Iowa, USA
 Inland Township, Michigan, USA
 Inland, Nebraska, USA
 Inland Township, Clay County, Nebraska, USA

Arts, entertainment, and media

Literature
 Inland (Murnane novel), a 1988 novel by Gerald Murnane
 Inland (Obreht novel), a 2019 novel by Téa Obreht
The Inland, an underprivileged Brazilian community in 3%

Film
 Inland (2022 film), a film by Fridtjof Ryder

Music
 Inland (Jars of Clay album), 2013, or the title song
 Inland (Mark Templeton album), 2009

Other uses
 Inland navigation, transport with ships via inland waterway
 Inland sea (geology), a shallow sea that covers central areas of continents during periods of high sea level